Basic Education High School No. 2 Pabedan (commonly known as Pabedan 2 High School) is a public high school in Pabedan township, Yangon. The school's main building is a landmark protected by the city, and is listed on the Yangon City Heritage List.

References

High schools in Yangon